Elegiac Stanzas is a poem by William Wordsworth, originally published in Poems, in Two Volumes (1807). Its full title is "Elegiac Stanzas, Suggested by a Picture of Peele Castle in a Storm, Painted by Sir George Beaumont."

Notes

1807 poems
Poetry by William Wordsworth